Florence, Wisconsin may refer to:
Florence (CDP), Wisconsin, a census-designated place in and the county seat of Florence County
Florence (town), Wisconsin, a town in Florence County

es:Florence (Wisconsin)